The extraordinary G20 summit on COVID-19 is a G20 leaders' summit was held virtually via a video conference on 26 March 2020. The extraordinary G20 summit was called and chaired by King Salman of Saudi Arabia to support a coordinated global response to the COVID-19 pandemic.

Participating leaders 
source : G20 Information Centre

Invited guests

Statement 
These are the outlines of the summit's statement on COVID-19:

 Commit to taking all necessary health measures to fight the pandemic and protect lives.
 Support economies, protect people's jobs and minimize the economic and social damage from the pandemic.
 Restore confidence, preserve financial stability, strengthen global growth and maintain market stability.
 Minimize disruptions to trade and global supply chains.
 Provide help to all countries in need of assistance.
 Enhancing global cooperation on public health and financial measures.

References 

2020 conferences
2020 in international relations
2020 in Saudi Arabia
21st-century diplomatic conferences (Global)
2020 G20 summit
Diplomatic conferences in Saudi Arabia
2020 Riyadh
